Hughes House is a historic home located at Jefferson Township in Greene County, Pennsylvania. It was built in 1814, and is a -story, three bay, banked stone dwelling. It has a small, -story extension and a steeply pitched gable roof.

It was listed on the National Register of Historic Places in 1972.

References 

Houses on the National Register of Historic Places in Pennsylvania
Houses completed in 1814
Houses in Greene County, Pennsylvania
National Register of Historic Places in Greene County, Pennsylvania